Sedef Shipyard is a Turkish shipyard established in Gebze, Kocaeli in 1972. Shipyard moved to Tuzla, Istanbul in 1990. The shipyard is building defense industry ships and commercial ships such as the multi-purpose amphibious assault ship  to be used by the Turkish Naval Forces. In 2000, the shipyard became a subsidiary of Turkon Holding.

The shipyard was qualified in 2009 by obtaining the necessary documents to take part in military projects. In 2013, the company won the tender for a multi-purpose amphibious assault ship project, which will be the largest ship in the Turkish Navy and can carry one battalion. Within the scope of this project, the construction of TCG Anadolu started in 2015 and the ship was launched in 2019.

The construction of a sister ship, to be named , is currently planned by the Turkish Navy.

See also 
 Ships built at Sedef Shipyard

References 

Turkish companies established in 1972
Shipyards of Turkey
Defence companies of Turkey
Shipbuilding companies of Turkey
Tuzla, Istanbul